The Tuscan regional election of 1970 took place on 7–8 June 1970. It was the first-ever regional election.

Electoral law 
Election was held under proportional representation with provincial constituencies where the largest remainder method with a Droop quota was used. To ensure more proportionality, remained votes and seats were transferred at regional level and calculated at-large.

Results
The Italian Communist Party was by far the largest party. After the election, the Communists formed a left-wing coalition government with the Italian Socialist Party and the Italian Socialist Party of Proletarian Unity. Lelio Lagorio, a Socialist, was elected President of the Region.

Source: Ministry of the Interior

References

1970 elections in Italy
1970 regional election
1970
June 1970 events in Europe